David López Ribes (born June 27, 1972 in Valencia, Spain) is a Spanish painter and multidisciplinary artist. He lives and works in Valencia.

His studies took place at the Polytechnic University of Valencia, UPV between 1991 and 1995, and at the School of Visual Arts in New York City during 2003.

David López Ribes is the winner of the Pontifical Academies Prize 2012 by Pope Benedict XVI, for his contribution to Christian Humanism on the contemporary.

Overview 
David López's work is mainly pictorial, partly heir of informalism. However, as of the year 2000 he develops New Media (video, sculpture and installation).
They are spiritual and transcendental works, which are clearly influenced by his personal life.
Through painting, sculpture and video art projected onto real objects, he addresses issues such as: father, sacrifice, gift, transit and kingdom, in the content of his work and also has a constant preoccupation for using media as a means to dialogue with the secular man.
Creating connections between Contemporary Culture and Faith.

David López Ribes video installations are designed to cause reflection on perception while at the same time reconsidering video as a medium in itself.
They are images that want to be here with us out of the boundaries of the 'frame' and into real life images projected on real objects on the same action performed. They are multimedia installations that blur the boundary between the tangible and the transcendental.
The nostalgia of harmony, the rejection of subjectivism, and liturgies of everyday life as an expression of moral integrity, are his cross-cutting themes.
His work is present in public and private collections nationally and internationally.

David López is awarded with the Young Art Prize 96 from IVAJ (Valencian Youth Institute) in 1997, and has held art exhibits in the Palau de la Musica (The Music Palace) in Valencia, in the House of Culture of Castellón and Alicante´s 14 Center, among others. That summer he worked with painter Antonio López.
In August 1997 he moved to Paris, where he lived until 2000, a period in which he helped manage Cultural Affairs of the Instituto Cervantes in Paris and made his first solo exhibits in France. He also began his relationship with the Japanese Nichido Gallery, where he continuously exhibits artwork, both individual and collective.

In 2001, he had an art exhibit at Charpa Gallery, Valencia.
In 2002, he received the Visual Arts Fellowship from the Generalitat Valenciana and thus traveled to New York in 2003, for a New Media Master´s at the School of Visual Arts in New York City.
In 2004, he had an art exhibit at Edgar Neville Gallery in Valencia, commissioned by the painter José Sanleón, and director of the Valencian Institute of Modern Art IVAM Consuelo Ciscar.

In 2008, he was the winner of the X National Painting Prize  Milagros Mir.
In 2011, he had another art exhibit in Valencia at the Palau de la Música.
In the same year he participates in the exhibit Art + Fe' at the Pons Foundation in Madrid, within the official program of the World Youth Day 2011. This exhibit has been presented at the Cultural Institute The Brocense, in Caceres, Lisbon and is now coming to Castellon and Valencia. López gives the inaugural speech. His artwork is present in public and private collections at a national and international level.

From 1999, David López, along with the Spanish painter Kiko Argüello and an international team of painters, develop a New Aesthetic for the Catholic Church in seminaries, churches and liturgical spaces worldwide.

2012 Brasilia, Brazil, Shanghai, China
2011 Madrid and Valencia, Spain
2010 New Jersey US, Shanghai China, Managua Nicaragua, Valencia Spain,
2009 Rome Italy, Warsaw Poland, Valencia Spain
2008 Macerata, Italy
2007 Strasbourg France, Rome Italy
2006 Perugia Italy, 
2005 Strasbourg France, Berlin Germany, Murcia Spain
2004 Catedral de la Almudena Madrid Spain
2003 Domus Galilea Israel
2001 Madrid
2000 Oulu Finland
1999 Piacenza Italy

Selected exhibitions 
 1995 Sala de Exposiciones de la Universidad Politécnica Valencia
 1997 Palau de la Música Valencia, Casa Cultura Castellón y Centro 14 Alicante
 1998 Colegio de España París
 1999 Centro Cultural de la Villa in Madrid and Galerie Bernanos París
 2000 Sala Parpallo, Museo de la Beneficencia and Estación del Norte Valencia
 2001 Galerie Nichido París
 2002 Galería Charpa Valencia, Museo de la Ciudad Valencia and Museo de la Ciudad Madrid
 2003 Galerie Nichido París
 2004 Galería Edgar Neville Valencia.
 2005 Museo de Arte Moderno Valencia IVAM and Galería Gabernia Valencia
 2007 Galerie Nichido París
 2009 Museo A Mir Valencia and Galerie Nichido París
 2010 Marion Meyer Gallery California and Galerie Nichido París
 2011 Palau de la Musica Valencia, Fundacion Pons Madrid 
 2012 Centro Cultural El Brocense Caceres, Lisboa and Castellon .

References

External links 
 David lopez website
 Rome Reports
 video art david lopez
 Saatchi Gallery
 interview Zenit 2012
 interview Zenit 2011
 Artway.eu
 Marion Meyer Gallery
 Galerie Nichido

1972 births
Living people
People from Valencia
20th-century Spanish painters
20th-century Spanish male artists
Spanish male painters
21st-century Spanish painters
Spanish contemporary artists
21st-century Spanish male artists